Timothy M. Kelleher (born 20 June 1970) is an Irish former sportsperson. He played hurling with his local club Erin's Own and was a member of the Cork senior inter-county team from 1991 until 1997.

References

1970 births
Living people
Erin's Own (Cork) hurlers
Cork inter-county hurlers
Munster inter-provincial hurlers